Första divisionen is a 1941 Swedish drama film directed by Hasse Ekman.

Plot summary
After a period of hospitalization, caused by an aircraft accident, second lieutenant Gunnar Bråde returns to his old squadron. During an exercise a bomb hits his plane's propeller and he is forced to jump out with a parachute over the target area. This is not observed by any of the pilots, who continue to drop their bombs...

Cast 
Lars Hanson as Colonel Magnus Ståhlberg, commander of Royal Nerike Air Force Wing in Lindesnäs
Gunnar Sjöberg as Captain Krister Hansson, squadron commander
Stig Järrel as Lieutenant Rutger Sperling
Hasse Ekman as Second lieutenant Gunnar Bråde
Emil Fjellström as Sergeant major Persson
Ragnar Falck as Sergeant Bertil "Jocke" Johansson, signaller
Carl Reinholdz as Corporal "Storken" Karlsson
Irma Christenson as Mona Falkstedt, Kristers fiancée
Britta Brunius as Greta Johansson, Jockes wife
Linnéa Hillberg as Mrs. Bråde, Gunnars mother
Hugo Björne as Docent Åkerman, oculist
Kotti Chave as Lieutenant Billman, "Bill" 
Bror Bügler as Captain Fallenius, Medical Officer
Not credited
Ingemar Holde as Corporal "Jompa" Blomgren
Karl Erik Flens as Sjövall, mässuppassare
Elsa Ebbesen as Lovisa, Mrs Bråde's maid
Gerda Björne as Mrs Falkstedt, Mona's mother
Agda Helin as Owner of the glove shop
Bengt Järrel as Billman's signaller
Walter Sarmell as Hansson's signaller
Mary Gräber as lady in Docent Åkerman's waiting room
Mona Sjöstrand	as Docent Åkerman's nurse
Aurore Palmgren as the nurse at birthing center
Julie Bernby as customer in the glove shop
Sif Ruud as nurse in Sperling's hospital room
Gösta Seth as pilot
Axel Göte Ekdahl as pilot
Sven Hedberg as pilot
Åke Berg as pilot
Lennart Peyron as pilot
Rolf Svartengren as pilot
Nils Hellquist as pilot
Torkel Westerlund as air force officer at the farewell dinner
Claës-Henrik Nordenskiöld as air force officer at the farewell dinner
Bengt Rosenius as air force officer at the farewell dinner
Grels Naeslund as air force officer at the farewell dinner
Karl-Erik Nilson as air force officer at the farewell dinner
Harald Wahlén as air force officer at the farewell dinner

External links 
 

1941 films
Films directed by Hasse Ekman
1940s Swedish-language films
Swedish aviation films
Swedish drama films
1941 drama films
Swedish black-and-white films
Films scored by Lars-Erik Larsson
1940s Swedish films